Boris Alexandrovich Skibin (3 June 1876 – 3 December 1937), spelled Skibine in French, was a Russian ballet dancer with the Ballets Russes, as was his son, George. Boris Skibine appeared in Gaston Roudès' 1935 comedy, Le chant de l'amour. 

Skibin was born in the village of Sharapovka, near Belgorod, and served during with the Imperial Army during World War I. He was executed in 1937 during the Great Purge. He was posthumously rehabilitated in 1989.

See also
 List of Russian ballet dancers

References

External links
 

1876 births
1937 deaths
Russian male ballet dancers
Ballet Russe de Monte Carlo dancers
Recipients of the Order of St. Anna, 3rd class
Recipients of the Order of St. Anna, 2nd class
Recipients of the Order of St. Vladimir, 4th class
Recipients of the Order of St. Vladimir, 3rd class
Great Purge victims from Russia
Male ballet dancers from the Russian Empire